Banten Girang is an ancient settlement located in Sempu village, Serang city, Banten province, Indonesia. It is located by the Cibanten River about 10 km south of the port of Banten, on the southern outskirts of Serang town. In that place there is an archaeological site which estimated dated to the era of Sunda Kingdom between 932 and 1030 CE. The term Banten Girang, meaning "Banten-up-the-river" referring to its location.

The Banten Girang archaeological site consists of several tombs, punden berundak stepped pyramid, and the caves of Banten Girang. The caves is man-made holes carved on stone cliff, and took form of small niches.

According to the research conducted by a French archaeologist Claude Guillot in 1988–1992, the Banten Girang site is a residential or settlement site. He estimated that this site originated in the 10th century and reached its peak between the 13th-14th century CE.

The settlement was the predecessor of the eponymous Banten Sultanate that located further downstream on the coastal area, that in the 16th century rose to become an important port in the region, especially vital for pepper trade of that era.

History
The vicinity of Banten Girang was settled since the 10th century or probably earlier. In the National Museum of Indonesia in Jakarta, there are a number of 10th century Hindu statues dubbed as the "Caringin statues", because they were once used as the garden decoration of Dutch assistant-resident in Caringin, a village by the Sunda Strait. The statue reportedly was found in Cipanas area, near the crater of Mount Pulosari, east of Caringin or further southwest from Banten Girang.

The Hindu pantheon images consists of one pedestal and 5 statues of Shiva Mahadeva, Durga, Agastya, Ganesha and Brahma. The style of these statues is similar to those of Central Javanese Hindu statue dated from the beginning of the 10th century, linked with the religious symbolism and artistic style of the Medang Mataram Hindu kingdom in Central Java. Therefore, Mount Pulosari is associated with nearby Banten Girang, and is estimated to be one of the religious center of the Sundanese kingdom.

The Chinese source, Chu-fan-chi, written circa 1200, Chou Ju-kua identified the two most powerful and richest kingdoms in the Indonesian archipelago as Sriwijaya and Java (Kediri). According to this source, in the early 13th century, Sriwijaya still ruled Sumatra, the Malay peninsula, and the port of Sin-t'o (Sunda) in western Java. The source identifies the port of Sunda as strategic and thriving, pepper from Sunda being among the best in quality. The people worked in agriculture and their houses were built on wooden poles (rumah panggung). However, robbers and thieves plagued the country. It was uncertain which port of Sunda was referred to by Chou Ju-kua. The port is located near the Strait of Sunda, thus it probably referred to the port of Banten instead of Kalapa (present day Jakarta).

In early 16th century, the ruler of Banten was Prabu Pucuk Umun with the seat of government located in Banten Girang. The Banten Ilir or Banten Lama at that time served as its port. The religion adopted by Prabu Pucuk Umun and his people at that time was Hinduism. On the banks of the Cibanten River, there is an artificial cave carved on a cliff edge. The cave has two entrances in which there are three rooms.

According to Sajarah Banten, when arrived in Banten Girang, Sunan Gunungjati and his son, Hasanuddin, visited Mount Pulosari, which was the spiritual center for the kingdom. There, Gunungjati converted the local community to Islam and conquered the kingdom militarily. In 1526 the Demak forces seized the ports of Banten and the settlement of Banten Girang, led by Gunungjati, assisted by Hasanuddin and Ki Jongjo. Then, with the blessing of the Sultan of Demak, he became the ruler of Banten.

Banten Girang was mentioned as Wahanten Girang in Carita Parahyangan, a late 16th century manuscript, which states that Wahanten Girang was defeated by Arya Bubrah, a figure interpreted as Fatahillah Khan, a military commander of Demak-Cirebon who also captured Sunda Kalapa.

Gunungjati did not establish a new kingdom, but seized the throne from an existing Banten Girang polity. Hasanuddin ascended to the throne, succeeded the Sundanese king who in Portuguese sources was called as King Samiam (Sanghyang) which just passed away. This event marked as the founding of the Islamic Kingdom of Banten. Hasanuddin moved the royal capital from Banteng Girang several kilometres downstream to the port of Banten. Until the end of the 17th century, Banten Girang was still used as a resting palace or a retreat residence for Banten kings.

References

Precolonial states of Indonesia
History of West Java
Sunda Kingdom
Banten